Asher W. Bizzell House is a historic home located at Rosin, Sampson County, North Carolina.   The house was built about 1820, and is a two-room, vernacular-Coastal Carolina cottage form frame dwelling.  It has front and rear engaged porches and shed rooms. It was moved to its present site about 1870.   The house is adjacent to the separately listed Jonas McPhail House and Annie McPhail Store.

It was added to the National Register of Historic Places in 1986.

References

Houses on the National Register of Historic Places in North Carolina
Houses completed in 1820
Houses in Sampson County, North Carolina
National Register of Historic Places in Sampson County, North Carolina